León S. Morra (1882–1948) was an Argentine physician and university professor. He was born in Córdoba in 1882 and died on March 16, 1948.

Education and career
Morra studied at the National University of Córdoba. There, in 1902, he graduated as a pharmacist and, seven years later, as a surgeon. In 1913, he served as assistant professor of neurology and psychiatry at the Faculty of Medicine, and was also a counselor and head of the department from 1918.

He was mayor of the city of Córdoba, in the period between July 15, 1918 and the same date in 1921. Three years later he became rector of the University, a position he held until 1928, returning to take up the position again from 1945 to 1946. In 1927 he founded the "Las Rosas" sanatorium, which now bears his name, and directed it until his death in the city of Córdoba on March 16, 1948.

References 

Argentine neurologists
1882 births
1948 deaths
20th-century Argentine physicians